Andrew Airlie (born September 18, 1961) is a Scottish-born Canadian actor.

Early life
Airlie was born in Glasgow, Scotland on September 18, 1961.

Career
He has starred in television series including Breaker High and his TV credits include guest starring in popular television shows such as Monk, Smallville, Stargate SG-1 , The X-Files and Fringe. He had television regular roles as Mr. Oliver, the protagonist's father, on the series, Reaper, which aired from 2007 until 2009, and as Mission Control Commander Mike Goss on the series Defying Gravity in 2009.

His best-known film role was as Michael Corman in Final Destination 2. He portrays Carrick Grey, father of Christian Grey, in the Fifty Shades of Grey films.

Filmography

Film

Television

Trust in Me (1996) - Dan
Downhill Willie (1996) - Jack Murphy
The Outer Limits (1996-2003) - Marcus Fellows / Jonathan Morris / Don / Dr. Kevington / F.B.I. Agent Corey Lonn
Beauty (1998, TV Movie) - Joel
In the Blue Ground (1999) - Mike Ogden
The Safety of Objects (2001) - Bruce Jennings
Trapped (2002) - Holden
Final Destination 2 (2003) - Michael Corman
Shattered Glass (2003) - Alec Shumpert
Jack (2004, TV Movie) - Michael
Going the Distance (2004) - Jerry
Fantastic Four (2005) - Compound Doctor
Neverwas (2005) - Head Editor
The Butterfly Effect 2 (2006) - Ron Callahan
Normal (2008) - Dale
Case 39 (2009) - Doctor
Defying Gravity (2009, TV Series) - Mike Goss
Dear Mr. Gacy (2010) - Professor Harris
Apollo 18 (2011) - Mission Control (voice)
50/50 (2011) - Dr. Ross
Geek Charming (2011, TV Movie) - Alan Schoenfield
Fairly Legal (2012, TV Series) - Neal Mathews
The Company You Keep (2012) - Albany FBI Senior Agent
Once Upon a Time (2013, TV Series) - George Darling
Big Eyes (2014) - Rich Man
Fifty Shades of Grey (2015) - Carrick Grey
The Fixer (2015, TV Mini-Series) - Grant
Fifty Shades Darker (2017) - Carrick Grey
Fifty Shades Freed (2018) - Carrick Grey
Sailing Into Love (2019) - Joseph Richards

Video games
Mugen (1999) - Additional voices

References

External links

Andrew Airlie's official website

Living people
1961 births
Canadian male film actors
Canadian male television actors
Canadian male voice actors
Naturalized citizens of Canada
Canadian people of Scottish descent
Male actors from Glasgow